Fortuna is a Hispanic brand of cigarettes, currently owned and manufactured by the Franco-Spanish company Altadis, a subsidiary of Imperial Tobacco. Fortuna is Spanish for fortune or luck.

History

Fortuna was first introduced in 1974 in Francoist Spain by Tabacalera, a Spanish tobacco conglomerate which is now half of the Altadis corporation. When Fortuna was launched in 1974, the market was dominated by black tobacco and the few international brands of blonde (light) cigarettes that were very expensive for the Spanish smoker. As a response to this, Tabacalera launched Fortuna cigarettes which were a type of blonde tobacco with a filter. With Fortuna came the first American blonde flavoured cigarette and in its first six months almost 700 million cigarettes were sold.  Ten years later, it spread internationally, first in France, and then in countries like Italy, Morocco and the United States. For more than thirty years, Fortuna has been the best-selling brand in the blonde cigarette market, surpassing even the arrival of international brands in Spain. The tobacco mixture used in Fortuna cigarettes is of a Virginia type.

In April 2008, Altadis changed the pack design to a "new and modernized look" and reduced the number of its big pack cigarettes from 25 to 24, with the aim of setting a round price (which was €3,00 at the time). At that time, Fortuna was the second best-selling brand on the cigarette market. In 2007 it obtained 10.665 million cigarettes were sold, with an increase in the volume of 3%, which allowed it to increase its quota by 0.3 points to reach almost 14% of the segment of blond cigarettes. The great rival of Altadis is Philip Morris International.

In 2013, Fortuna was the fourth best-selling brand in Spain with more than 184,000,000 packs sold.

In 2015, the taxes of Fortuna, Ducados, and Nobel were once again increased from €4.40 to €4.45; an increase of 5 cents.

In December 2016, Altadis raised the price of their Fortuna, Ducados, and Nobel brands by 10 cents, while opting to keep their Fortuna soft pack brand at €4,45.

Advertising 
Tabacalera and Altadis made various poster and magazine advertisements in the 1980s, 1990s and 2000s to promote the Fortuna brand.

Besides poster and magazine adverts, a few TV adverts were also made. Some were made for Spain, but also for other countries such as Venezuela.

A few telephone cards have also been made, featuring Fortuna adverting on them.

Other memorabilia that Tabacalera made during the time, includes lighters, calendars and game cars, featuring Fortuna advertising.

Sponsorship

Grand prix motorcycle racing
Fortuna was a sponsor of various teams within the Grand Prix motorcycle racing classes. In races where anti-tobacco laws were in places (such as France and Germany) the Fortuna name was replaced with the "Spain's N°1" logo.

MotoGP
Fortuna sponsored the Pons Racing team in the 500cc class in 1995 and 1996.

Fortuna sponsored the Gresini Racing team in the MotoGP class in 2002 and 2006.

Fortuna sponsored the official Yamaha MotoGP team in the MotoGP class, along with Gauloises, from 2003 until 2005.

Fortuna sponsored the satellite Yamaha MotoGP Tech 3 team in the MotoGP class from 2003 until 2005.

250cc
Fortuna sponsored the Gresini Racing team in the 250cc class in 2002 and 2003.

Fortuna sponsored the Honda team in the 250cc class in 2004 and 2005.

Fortuna sponsored the Aprilia Racing team in the 250cc class in 2006 and 2007.

Sportscar racing
Fortuna sponsored the Brun Motorsport team in the 1980s.

Markets
Fortuna is mainly sold in Spain, but was or still is sold in Morocco, Italy, France, Austria, Poland, Romania, Russia, Venezuela and Brazil. In the United States, Fortuna cigarettes are manufactured by Commonwealth Brands in Reidsville, North Carolina.

See also

 Tobacco smoking

References

Altadis brands
Products introduced in 1974
Imperial Brands brands